The 1993 Australian Open was a tennis tournament played on outdoor hard courts at Flinders Park in Melbourne in Victoria in Australia. It was the 81st edition of the Australian Open and was held from 18 through 31 January 1993.

Seniors

Men's singles

 Jim Courier defeated  Stefan Edberg 6–2, 6–1, 2–6, 7–5
 It was Courier's 4th and last career Grand Slam title and his 2nd Australian Open title.

Women's singles

 Monica Seles defeated  Steffi Graf 4–6, 6–3, 6–2
 It was Seles' 8th career Grand Slam title and her 3rd Australian Open title.

Men's doubles

 Danie Visser /  Laurie Warder defeated  John Fitzgerald /  Anders Järryd 6–4, 6–3, 6–4
 It was Visser's 3rd and last career Grand Slam title and his 2nd Australian Open title. It was Warder's only career Grand Slam title.

Women's doubles

 Gigi Fernández /  Natasha Zvereva defeated  Pam Shriver /  Elizabeth Smylie 6–4, 6–3
 It was Fernández's 7th career Grand Slam title and her 1st Australian Open title. It was Zvereva's 7th career Grand Slam title and her 1st Australian Open title.

Mixed doubles

 Arantxa Sánchez Vicario /  Todd Woodbridge defeated  Zina Garrison-Jackson /  Rick Leach 7–5, 6–4
 It was Sánchez Vicario's 5th career Grand Slam title and her 2nd Australian Open title. It was Woodbridge's 3rd career Grand Slam title and his 2nd Australian Open title.

Juniors

Boys' singles
 James Baily defeated  Steven Downs 6–3, 6–2

Girls' singles
 Heike Rusch defeated  Andrea Glass 6–1, 6–2

Boys' doubles
 Lars Rehmann /  Christian Tambue defeated  Scott Humphries /  Jimmy Jackson 6–7, 7–5, 6–2

Girls' doubles
 Joana Manta /  Ludmila Richterová defeated  Åsa Carlsson /  Cătălina Cristea 6–3, 6–2

Prize money

Total prize money for the event was A$6,455,000.

References

External links
 Australian Open official website

 
 

 
1993 in Australian tennis
January 1993 sports events in Australia
1993,Australian Open